Charles Guyot (4 August 1890 – 30 April 1958) was a Swiss racing cyclist. He was the Swiss National Road Race champion in 1909 and 1910. He also rode in three editions of the Tour de France. His son Charles was also a professional racing cyclist.

References

External links

 

1890 births
1958 deaths
Swiss male cyclists
Sportspeople from the canton of Bern